The Europe Zone was one of the three regional zones of the 1977 Davis Cup.

33 teams entered the Europe Zone, competing across 2 sub-zones. 8 teams entered the competition in the pre-qualifying rounds, competing for 3 spots in the preliminary rounds. The 3 winners in the pre-qualifying rounds joined an additional 21 teams in the preliminary rounds, with 12 teams in each sub-zone competing for 4 places in the main draw, to join the 4 finalists from the 1976 Europe Zone.

The winners of each sub-zone's main draw went on to compete in the Inter-Zonal Zone against the winners of the Americas Zone and Eastern Zone.

France defeated Romania in the Zone A final, and Italy defeated Spain in the Zone B final, resulting in both France and Italy progressing to the Inter-Zonal Zone.

Zone A

Pre-qualifying rounds

Draw

Qualifying round
Iran vs. Algeria

Preliminary rounds

Draw

First round
Poland vs. Norway

Switzerland vs. Rhodesia

Belgium vs. Bulgaria

Ireland vs. Iran

Qualifying round
Poland vs. West Germany

Switzerland vs. France

Romania vs. Belgium

Czechoslovakia vs. Ireland

Main draw

Draw

Quarterfinals
Poland vs. France

Romania vs. Czechoslovakia

Semifinals
France vs. Soviet Union

Due to their refusal to play against Chile in the 1976 Inter-Zonal semifinals, the Soviet Union were disqualified from the 1977 tournament. Therefore France were declared winners by default and progressed to the final.

Romania vs. Great Britain

Final
France vs. Romania

Zone B

Pre-qualifying rounds

Draw

Qualifying round
Israel vs. Turkey

Luxembourg vs. Finland

Preliminary rounds

Draw

First round
Netherlands vs. Israel

Greece vs. Denmark

Portugal vs. Monaco

Austria vs. Finland

Qualifying round
Netherlands vs. Yugoslavia

Greece vs. Spain

Sweden vs. Monaco

Austria vs. Egypt

Main draw

Draw

Quarterfinals
Yugoslavia vs. Spain

Sweden vs. Austria

Semifinals
Hungary vs. Spain

Sweden vs. Italy

Final
Spain vs. Italy

References

Davis Cup Europe/Africa Zone
Europe Zone
Davis Cup
Davis Cup
Davis Cup
Davis Cup
Davis Cup
Davis Cup
Davis Cup